Sir William Eley Cuthbert Quilter, 2nd Baronet (17 July 1873 – 18 September 1952)
was an English Conservative Party politician.

Quilter was the son of the Liberal politician Sir William Quilter, 1st Baronet (1841–1911).

He was commissioned a second-lieutenant of the Suffolk Yeomanry (The Duke of York's Own Loyal Suffolk Hussars) on 26 March 1902.

He commissioned a house designed by Detmar Blow, and built in South Street, Mayfair, London, in 1902-1903. It was later the home of Lord Dunglass, the birthplace of Sir Alec Douglas-Home, and the home of Dame Barbara Cartland.

He was elected at the January 1910 general election as Member of Parliament (MP) for Sudbury in Suffolk,
a constituency held by his father until 1906.  He held the seat until the 1918 general election, when he did not stand again.

References

External links 
 

1873 births
1952 deaths
Baronets in the Baronetage of the United Kingdom
Conservative Party (UK) MPs for English constituencies
Suffolk Yeomanry officers
UK MPs 1910
UK MPs 1910–1918